Nerang State High School (NSHS) is a state high school located on the Gold Coast of  Queensland, Australia.

External links
Official Nerang State High School Website

Schools on the Gold Coast, Queensland
Public high schools in Queensland
Educational institutions established in 1986
1986 establishments in Australia